Graham Baker may refer to:

 Graham Baker (footballer) (born 1958), English former footballer
 Graham Baker (director), British film director
 C. Graham Baker (1883–1950), American screenwriter and director